Gloria Blondell (August 16, 1915 – March 25, 1986) was a stage, film, and television actress who was the younger sister of actress Joan Blondell.

Family
Blondell was born into a vaudeville family. Her parents and siblings, Edward Jr. and Joan, were all entertainers. She once said, "[S]ome member of my family has been in the theater ever since the time of Richard the Lionhearted." Her father, Levi Blustine (or Bluestein), a vaudeville comedian known as Ed Blondell, was born in Poland to a Jewish family circa 1865 and died in Glendale, California, on March 27, 1943. He toured for many years starring in the Blondell/Fennessy stage version of The Katzenjammer Kids. Blondell's mother, Catherine (also known as Kathryn or Katie) Caine, was born in Brooklyn, New York City, New York, on April 13, 1884, of Irish descent. She died on October 5, 1952, in Glendale, California.

Stage
Gloria Blondell said that she first went on stage when she was 9 months old, and she was described as "a trouper at three [years of age]." Her family comprised a vaudeville troupe, the "Bouncing Blondells", whose members were her parents, her sister and her brother. In 1935, she appeared in the Broadway production of Three Men on a Horse at the Playhouse in New York City.

Radio
Gloria Blondell was a popular featured actress during the Golden Age of Radio. Blondell had the role of secretary Jerry Booker on I Love a Mystery.
Her appearances on radio include The Adventures of Philip Marlowe; Yours Truly, Johnny Dollar; Lux Radio Theatre; Arch Oboler's Plays; Richard Diamond, Private Detective; Screen Directors Playhouse, and The Great Gildersleeve.

Film
Blondell co-starred with Ronald Reagan in Accidents Will Happen (1938) and with Hans Conried in The Twonky (1953). She was also in Daredevil Drivers (1938) and Three Sappy People (1939).

Television
In her television performances, Blondell may be best remembered for her role as Honeybee Gillis in the 1950s sitcom starring William Bendix, The Life of Riley. She was cast in that series opposite Tom D'Andrea as her husband, Jim Gillis. She appeared in the I Love Lucy episode "The Anniversary Present" (1952).

She portrayed an aging prostitute who rescues a town from a trio of criminals in "The Looters", an episode of Wanted Dead or Alive.

Voice-over
For Daisy Duck's second appearance as a Disney cartoon character, she took over, marking the debut of Daisy's "normal" voice. Blondell would voice Daisy for six of her nine speaking appearances during the classic shorts era.

Personal life
She married film producer Albert R. Broccoli on July 26, 1940; they divorced August 7, 1945. The following year, on September 14, she married Victor Hunter in Monterey, California. They remained married until his death in 1980, just weeks after her sister's death. Gloria and Victor had one daughter, who was born prematurely and died at birth. During the child's delivery, Gloria also nearly died from blood loss, but her life was saved by an emergency hysterectomy.

Like her sister Joan, Gloria was a registered Republican, and both siblings endorsed Dwight Eisenhower for president in the 1952 presidential election.

Death
Blondell died at age 70 in 1986 in Santa Monica, California from cancer. Her body was cremated.

Filmography

References

External links
 

1915 births
1986 deaths
20th-century American actresses
Actresses from New York City
American film actresses
American voice actresses
Jewish American actresses
American radio actresses
American stage actresses
American television actresses
Deaths from cancer in California
American people of Irish descent
California Republicans
New York (state) Republicans